DesignSpark Mechanical is a free 3D CAD (computer-aided design) solid modelling software application.

DesignSpark Mechanical enables users to solid model in a 3D environment and create files for use with 3D printers. 
Using the direct modelling approach, it allows for unlimited and frequent design changes using an intuitive set of tools. This free 3D CAD software is offered as a payment free download, but requires a one-time registration with DesignSpark.com to receive the latest community news and product promotions.

In order to create engineering drawings in the same framework, DesignSpark Mechanical Drawing, which is not free, would also be required.

Background 
DesignSpark Mechanical is based on the SpaceClaim Engineer application and is the product of a collaboration between RS Components and Ansys, Inc.
An introductory brochure is available here. 
The goal to offer a free 3D CAD software with many features of high-end software is to engage with those such as Engineering Students or small businesses who may not require or who cannot afford premium branded 3D CAD software.

Rapid prototyping 
DesignSpark Mechanical supports Rapid Prototyping through SpaceClaim's 3D direct modelling methodology using the Pull, Move, Fill and Combine tools that allow a user to interact with digital 3D objects like modelling with clay, all available in the free 3D CAD version.

3D CAD library 
3D models for more than 75,000 products from the RS catalog are available for download within the software.

Add-on modules 
Paid add-on modules are available and provide functionality for the free 3D CAD DesignSpark Mechanical software, such as full support of two popular 3D file formats (Export and import file type: STEP & IGES) and an associative drawing environment, adding many functions such as  cosmetic Threading, GD&T, Annotations and more.

See also 
 Comparison of 3D computer graphics software
 Comparison of computer-aided design editors
 DesignSpark PCB
 DesignSpark PCB Pro

References

Further reading
"Diseñar en 3D con DesignSpark Mechanical". Automática e instrumentación. No. 454, 2013. pages 36–37.  
"推出3D设计软件 DesignSpark Mechanical". Global Electronics China. No. 10. 2013.  
"DesignSpark Mechanical upgraded with optional modules". New Electronics. 
"48-Hour 3D Design Challenge With DesignSpark Mechanical". EE Times. 
"DesignSpark Mechanical: It's Not Your Grandmother's MCAD!". EE Times. 
"DesignSpark Mechanical gets 3D print slicing in v4 upgraded". ElectronicsWeekly.com.
"DesignSpark Mechanical User Design Challenge". Engineering.com.
"DesignSpark Mechanical Power Hack". Engineering.com.
"Independent software reviews on Capterra". Capterra.com.

External links
 
 Official Forum
 Independent review of software

Computer-aided design software